The Leeds City Council elections were held on Thursday, 7 May 1992, with one third of the council's seats up for election.

Held one month after the 1992 general election where Conservatives won a surprise fourth term, the Conservatives in Leeds shared in that success, surpassing Labour's vote for the first time in a decade, and winning their greatest share since 1978. Despite these feats, their vote remained constant with recent elections - in stark contrast to the opposition parties, whose votes had seen dramatic falls, with the Liberal Democrat vote their lowest since 1978, and Labour's their lowest recorded since the council's creation in 1973.

The minor parties also saw disappointment, with the Liberal vote more than halved the previous year and comfortably their worst, whilst the Greens - in spite of a record number of candidates, up considerably from the year before - seen a decrease in their vote. All of which resulted in a record low in turnout, suggesting the Tory revival was driven more by their national result hurting opposition moral than any resurgence in their support.

The Conservatives were able to win their greatest number of wards since 1983, gaining a seat each from Labour and the Lib Dems in their respective marginals of Morley North and Horsforth. The Tory gain in Horsforth, as well as Labour's rise in Armley, left the Lib Dem victories confined to just two wards for the first time since 1979 (Burmantofts and Moortown), and their councillor total the lowest since 1980. The sole Independent standing, Peter Kersting, won his fourth term in Pudsey South with ease (with the first being won as Conservative).

Election result

This result had the following consequences for the total number of seats on the council after the elections:

Ward results

By-elections between 1992 and 1994

References

1992 English local elections
1992
1990s in Leeds